The year 1975 in film involved some significant events.

Highest-grossing films

North America

The top ten 1975 released films by box office gross in North America are as follows:

International
The highest-grossing 1975 films in countries outside of North America.

Worldwide gross
The following table lists known worldwide gross figures for several high-grossing films that originally released in 1975. Note that this list is incomplete and is therefore not representative of the highest-grossing films worldwide in 1975. This list also includes gross revenue from later re-releases.

Events
March 26: The film version of The Who's Tommy premieres in London.
May: In order to create the necessary special effects for his film, Star Wars, George Lucas forms Industrial Light and Magic.
June 20: Jaws is released and becomes the highest-grossing movie of all-time and the highest-grossing movie of the year and the first movie to earn $100 million in US and Canadian theatrical rentals, setting the standard for future blockbusters.
August 14: The cult classic film The Rocky Horror Picture Show premieres in London.
November 23: Sneak Previews, the first American film review show, premieres and launches the careers of critics Gene Siskel and Roger Ebert.  They will remain a team, and a staple among film critics, through various programs for the next twenty-four years.
December: Warner Bros. reorganize following John Calley's decision to step down as president-COO.  Frank Wells becomes president again and shares CEO duties with Ted Ashley who also returns as chairman.

Awards

Awards ceremonies 

Academy Awards
BAFTA Awards
Golden Globe Awards
Palme d'Or (Cannes Film Festival): Chronicle of the Years of Fire (Chronique des années de braise)
Golden Bear (Berlin Film Festival): Adoption (Örökbefogadás)

Notable awards

Films released 1975
Note: US releases unless stated.

January–March

April–June

July–September

October–December

Notable films released in 1975
Note: US releases unless stated

#
92 in the Shade, starring Peter Fonda, Warren Oates, Elizabeth Ashley, Margot Kidder

A
Aaron Loves Angela (December 25), directed by Gordon Parks, Jr., starring Moses Gunn
Adoption (Örökbefogadás), winner of Golden Bear  (Hungary)
The Adventure of Sherlock Holmes' Smarter Brother, directed by and starring Gene Wilder, with Madeline Kahn and Marty Feldman  (US/UK)
The Adventures of the Wilderness Family, starring Robert Logan
Afonya  (USSR)
Africa Express, starring Ursula Andress and Jack Palance  (Italy)
Aloha, Bobby and Rose (April 29), starring Paul Le Mat
Anno Domini 1573 (Yugoslavia)
Apoorva Raagangal (Rare Melodies)  (India)
The Apple Dumpling Gang, starring Don Knotts and Tim Conway
At Long Last Love, directed by Peter Bogdanovich, starring Burt Reynolds and Cybill Shepherd
Attilas '74, documentary  (Cyprus)
Autobiography of a Princess, directed by James Ivory, starring James Mason and Madhur Jaffrey  (UK)

B
Barry Lyndon, directed by Stanley Kubrick, starring Ryan O'Neal and Marisa Berenson  (US/UK)
The Beehive, directed by Fereydun Gole. (Iran)
The Best of Walt Disney's True-Life Adventures, directed by James Algar (documentary)
Bim  (Trinidad)
Bite the Bullet (June 20), directed by Richard Brooks, starring Gene Hackman, James Coburn, Candice Bergen, Jan-Michael Vincent, Ben Johnson
The Black Bird (December 25), starring George Segal
A Boy and His Dog, starring Don Johnson
Bullet Train (Shinkansen Daibakuha) - (Japan)
Brannigan, starring John Wayne
Breakheart Pass, starring Charles Bronson, Jill Ireland, Ben Johnson, Richard Crenna
Breakout (May 22), starring Charles Bronson, Jill Ireland, Robert Duvall
Brother, Can You Spare a Dime?, a documentary film about the Great Depression  (UK)
Bucktown, starring Fred Williamson and Pam Grier
Bugs Bunny: Superstar

C
Capone, starring Ben Gazzara
Chronicle of the Years of Fire (Chronique des Années de Braise)  (Algeria)
Chupke Chupke (Hush Hush), starring Dharmendra  (India)
The Claws of Light (Maynila... sa mga Kuko ng Liwanag)  (Philippines)
Cleopatra Jones and the Casino of Gold, starring Tamara Dobson and Stella Stevens
Conduct Unbecoming, starring Stacy Keach, Michael York and Richard Attenborough  (UK)
Cooley High, starring Glynn Turman
Coonskin, an animated film by Ralph Bakshi
Cornbread, Earl and Me, starring Laurence Fishburne
Crazy Mama, directed by Jonathan Demme, starring Cloris Leachman, Ann Sothern, Linda Purl
The Cycle (Dayereh-ye Mina)  (Iran)

D
The Day of the Locust, directed by John Schlesinger, starring Donald Sutherland, William Atherton, Karen Black
Deafula, first film entirely in American Sign Language
Death Race 2000, directed by Paul Bartel, starring David Carradine, Simone Griffeth, Sylvester Stallone
Deep Red, directed by Dario Argento, starring David Hemmings and Daria Nicolodi  (Italy)
Dersu Uzala, directed by Akira Kurosawa  (USSR/Japan)
Deewaar (The Wall), starring Shashi Kapoor  (India)
The Devil's Rain, starring Ernest Borgnine
Dialogues of Exiles (Diálogos de exiliados)  (Chile)
Diamonds, starring Robert Shaw, Richard Roundtree, Barbara Hershey, Shelley Winters
Doc Savage: The Man of Bronze, starring Ron Ely
Dog Day Afternoon (September 21), directed by Sidney Lumet, starring Al Pacino, John Cazale, Chris Sarandon, Charles Durning
The Drowning Pool, directed by Stuart Rosenberg, starring Paul Newman, Joanne Woodward, Anthony Franciosa, Melanie Griffith

E
The Eiger Sanction, directed by and starring Clint Eastwood, with George Kennedy and Jack Cassidy
The Empress Dowager (Qing guo qing cheng), starring Lisa Lu  (Hong Kong)
End of the Game, starring Maximilian Schell, Jon Voight, Jacqueline Bisset, Martin Ritt, Robert Shaw
Das Erdbeben in Chili, directed by Helma Sanders-Brahms  (West Germany)
Escape to Witch Mountain, starring Eddie Albert, Ray Milland, Donald Pleasence
Evrydiki BA 2O37 (Ευριδίκη ΒΑ 2Ο37), directed by Nikos Nikolaidis  (Greece/West Germany)

F
Fantozzi (a.k.a. White Collar Blues)  (Italy)
Farewell, My Lovely, directed by Dick Richards, starring Robert Mitchum, Charlotte Rampling, Jack O'Halloran, Sylvia Miles, John Ireland
Flame, starring Slade  (UK)
The Flower in His Mouth (Gente di rispetto), starring Jennifer O'Neill and Franco Nero  (Italy)
Fore Play, starring Zero Mostel and Estelle Parsons
The Fortune, directed by Mike Nichols, starring Jack Nicholson, Warren Beatty, Stockard Channing
Fox and His Friends (Faustrecht der Freiheit), directed by and starring Rainer Werner Fassbinder  (West Germany)
Framed, directed by Phil Karlson, starring Joe Don Baker
French Connection II, directed by John Frankenheimer, starring Gene Hackman, Fernando Rey, Bernard Fresson, Philippe Léotard
Friday Foster, starring Pam Grier
Funny Lady (March 15), directed by Herbert Ross, starring Barbra Streisand, James Caan, Omar Sharif
Furtivos (Poachers)  (Spain)

G
Galileo, directed by Joseph Losey, starring Topol, Edward Fox, John Gielgud  (UK)
The Giant Spider Invasion, starring Barbara Hale, Leslie Parrish, Alan Hale, Jr.
Give 'em Hell, Harry!, a biopic of Harry S. Truman starring James Whitmore
God's Gun, starring Lee Van Cleef and Jack Palance  (Italy/Israel)
Gone with the West, starring James Caan, Stefanie Powers and Aldo Ray
Graveyard of Honor (Jingi no hakaba)  (Japan)
Great, animated short  (UK)
The Great Waldo Pepper, directed by George Roy Hill, starring Robert Redford, Bo Svenson, Margot Kidder, Susan Sarandon
Grey Gardens, a documentary film

H
Hababam Sınıfı (Outrageous Class)  (Turkey)
Hagiga B'Snuker (Party at the Snooker)  (Israel)
Hans Christian Andersen's The Little Mermaid (Anderusen Dōwa Ningyo hime)  (Japan)
The Happy Hooker, starring Lynn Redgrave and Jean-Pierre Aumont
Hard Times (October 8), directed by Walter Hill, starring Charles Bronson and James Coburn
Hearts of the West, starring Jeff Bridges, Alan Arkin, Andy Griffith
Hedda, directed by Trevor Nunn, starring Peter Eyre and Glenda Jackson  (UK)
Hedgehog in the Fog (Yozhik v tumane)  (USSR)
Hello, I'm Your Aunt! (Zdravstvuyte, ya vasha tyotya!)  (USSR)
Hennessy, starring Rod Steiger and Lee Remick
Hester Street, starring Carol Kane
The Hiding Place, starring Julie Harris
The Hindenburg, directed by Robert Wise, starring George C. Scott, Anne Bancroft, William Atherton, Gig Young
The 'Human' Factor, directed by Edward Dmytryk, starring George Kennedy, John Mills, Rita Tushingham
Hustle, directed by Robert Aldrich, starring Burt Reynolds, Catherine Deneuve, Ben Johnson

I
In Celebration, directed by Lindsay Anderson, starring Alan Bates and Brian Cox  (UK)
Inserts, starring Richard Dreyfuss, Jessica Harper, Veronica Cartwright, Bob Hoskins  (UK)
The Irony of Fate (Ironiya sudby, ili S lyogkim parom!)  (USSR)

J
Jacob the Liar (Jakob, der Lügner)  (East Germany/Czechoslovakia)
 Jaws (June 20), directed by Steven Spielberg, starring Roy Scheider, Richard Dreyfuss, Robert Shaw
Jeanne Dielman, 23 quai du Commerce, 1080 Bruxelles, starring Delphine Seyrig  (France/Belgium)
Journey into Fear, starring Sam Waterston, Zero Mostel, Yvette Mimieux  (Canada)

K
Karayuki-san, the Making of a Prostitute, documentary by Shohei Imamura  (Japan)
Kaddu Beykat (a.k.a. Letter from My Village)  (Senegal)
Keetje Tippel (Katie Tippel), directed by Paul Verhoeven, starring Monique van de Ven and Rutger Hauer  (Netherlands)
The Killer Elite, directed by Sam Peckinpah, starring James Caan and Robert Duvall

L
L'important c'est d'aimer (That Most Important Thing: Love), starring Romy Schneider  (France)
The Land That Time Forgot, starring Doug McClure  (UK)
Legend of the Lawman (a.k.a. Walking Tall Part 2), starring Bo Svenson
Legend of the Werewolf, starring Peter Cushing  (UK)
Lepke, starring Tony Curtis
Let Joy Reign Supreme (Que la Fete Commence), directed by Bertrand Tavernier  (France)
Let's Do It Again, directed by and starring Sidney Poitier with Bill Cosby
Lies My Father Told Me, directed by Ján Kadár  (Canada)
The Lion Roars Again, documentary short
Lisztomania, directed by Ken Russell, starring Roger Daltrey, Sara Kestelman, Paul Nicholas  (UK)
The Lost Honour of Katharina Blum, directed by Volker Schlöndorff and Margarethe von Trotta  (West Germany)
Love and Death, directed by and starring Woody Allen, with Diane Keaton
Lucky Lady, directed by Stanley Donen, starring Gene Hackman, Liza Minnelli, Burt Reynolds

M
Mackintosh and T.J., starring Roy Rogers
The Magic Flute (Trollflöjten), a film version of the Mozart opera directed by Ingmar Bergman  (Sweden)
Mahogany, directed by Berry Gordy, starring Diana Ross, Billy Dee Williams, Anthony Perkins, Jean-Pierre Aumont
La Maldicion de la Bestia (Horror of the Werewolf), starring Paul Naschy  (Spain)
Man Friday, starring Peter O'Toole
The Man in the Glass Booth, directed by Arthur Hiller, starring Maximilian Schell and Lois Nettleton
The Man Who Would Be King, directed by John Huston, starring Sean Connery, Michael Caine, Christopher Plummer, Saeed Jaffrey  (UK/US)
Mandingo, directed by Richard Fleischer, starring James Mason, Susan George, Ken Norton, Perry King
Milestones
The Mirror (Zerkalo), directed by Andrei Tarkovsky  (USSR)
Mitchell, starring Joe Don Baker, Linda Evans, Martin Balsam, Merlin Olsen
Monty Python and the Holy Grail, directed by Terry Gilliam and Terry Jones, starring Graham Chapman, John Cleese, Eric Idle, Michael Palin, Gilliam and Jones  (UK)
Moonrunners, starring James Mitchum
Mother Küsters' Trip to Heaven (Mutter Küsters' Fahrt zum Himmel), directed by Rainer Werner Fassbinder  (West Germany)
Mr. Ricco, starring Dean Martin
My Friends (Amici miei), directed by Mario Monicelli  (Italy)

N
Nashville, directed by Robert Altman, starring Lily Tomlin, Keith Carradine, Ronee Blakley, Karen Black, Michael Murphy, Barbara Harris, Ned Beatty
Night Moves, directed by Arthur Penn, starring Gene Hackman, Melanie Griffith, Susan Clark, Jennifer Warren
Nights and Days (Noce i dnie)  (Poland)
Nishant (India)
Numéro deux (aka Number Two) directed by Jean-Luc Godard  (France)
The Noah, starring Robert Strauss

O
The Old Gun (Le vieux fusil), starring Philippe Noiret and Romy Schneider  (France)
Once Is Not Enough, starring Kirk Douglas, David Janssen, Brenda Vaccaro, Deborah Raffin, George Hamilton
One Flew Over the Cuckoo's Nest (November 19), directed by Miloš Forman, starring Jack Nicholson, Louise Fletcher, Brad Dourif, William Redfield, Will Sampson, Danny DeVito
One of Our Dinosaurs is Missing, starring Peter Ustinov and Helen Hayes  (US/UK)
Operation Daybreak, starring Timothy Bottoms, Anthony Andrews, Martin Shaw  (US/Czechoslovakia)
Osadeni Dushi (Doomed Souls)  (Bulgaria)
The Other Side of the Mountain, starring Marilyn Hassett and Beau Bridges
Out of Season, starring Vanessa Redgrave
Overlord, directed by Stuart Cooper  (UK)

P
The Passenger, directed by Michelangelo Antonioni, starring Jack Nicholson, Maria Schneider, Steven Berkoff  (Italy/France)
Peeper, directed by Peter Hyams, starring Michael Caine
Permission to Kill, starring Dirk Bogarde and Ava Gardner
Picnic at Hanging Rock, directed by Peter Weir, starring Rachel Roberts, Vivean Gray, Helen Morse  (Australia)
Pick-Up
The Pinchcliffe Grand Prix (Flåklypa Grand Prix)  (Norway)
Posse, directed by and starring Kirk Douglas
The Prisoner of Second Avenue, directed by Melvin Frank, starring Jack Lemmon and Anne Bancroft
The Promised Land (Ziemia Obiecana), directed by Andrzej Wajda  (Poland)

Q
Queen of the Gypsies (Tabor ukhodit v nebo)  (USSR)
Queen of the Stardust Ballroom, starring Maureen Stapleton and Charles Durning

R
Race with the Devil, starring Peter Fonda, Warren Oates, Loretta Swit, Lara Parker
Rafferty and the Gold Dust Twins, starring Alan Arkin, Sally Kellerman, Mackenzie Phillips
Rancho Deluxe, starring Jeff Bridges, Sam Waterston, Elizabeth Ashley, Clifton James, Harry Dean Stanton, Slim Pickens
The Reincarnation of Peter Proud, directed by J. Lee Thompson, starring Michael Sarrazin, Margot Kidder, Jennifer O'Neill
The Return of the Pink Panther (May 21), directed by Blake Edwards, starring Peter Sellers, Christopher Plummer, Herbert Lom  (UK)
The Return of the Sister Street Fighter (Kaette kita onna hissatsu ken)  (Japan)
Ride a Wild Pony, starring Robert Bettles, Eva Griffith, Michael Craig (US/ Australia)
The Rocky Horror Picture Show (August 14), directed by Jim Sharman, starring Tim Curry, Susan Sarandon, Richard O'Brien, Barry Bostwick  (US/UK)
Rollerball, directed by Norman Jewison, starring James Caan, John Houseman, John Beck, Maud Adams
The Romantic Englishwoman, directed by Joseph Losey, starring Glenda Jackson, Michael Caine, Helmut Berger  (UK)
Rooster Cogburn, starring John Wayne and Katharine Hepburn
Rosebud, directed by Otto Preminger, starring Peter O'Toole
Royal Flash, directed by Richard Lester, starring Malcolm McDowell, Oliver Reed, Alan Bates  (UK)
Russian Roulette, starring George Segal

S
Salò o le 120 giornate di Sodoma (aka Salo, or the 120 Days of Sodom), directed by Pier Paolo Pasolini  (Italy/France)
Le Sauvage (a.k.a. Lovers Like Us), starring Catherine Deneuve and Yves Montand  (France)
The Sensuous Nurse (L'Infermiera), starring Ursula Andress, Luciana Paluzzi, Jack Palance  (Italy)
Seven Beauties (Pasqualino Settebellezze), directed by Lina Wertmüller  (Italy)
Shampoo (February 11), directed by Hal Ashby, starring Warren Beatty, Julie Christie, Goldie Hawn, Lee Grant, Jack Warden, Carrie Fisher
Shivers (a.k.a. They Came from Within)  (Canada)
Sholay, the highest grossing Bollywood film of all time  (India)
Slashed Dreams, starring Peter Hooten and Robert Englund
Smile, directed by Michael Ritchie, starring Bruce Dern and Barbara Feldon
Special Section (Section spéciale), directed by Costa Gavras  (France)
Snow White and the Seven Dwarfs, re-release
The Stepford Wives (February 12), directed by Bryan Forbes, starring Katharine Ross, Paula Prentiss, Peter Masterson, Tina Louise
The Story of Adele H. (L'Histoire d'Adèle H.), directed by François Truffaut, starring Isabelle Adjani and Bruce Robinson  (France)
The Strongest Man in the World, starring Kurt Russell
Sunday Too Far Away, starring Jack Thompson  (Australia)
The Sunshine Boys, directed by Herbert Ross, starring Walter Matthau, George Burns, Richard Benjamin
Supervixens, cult adult film directed by Russ Meyer
Switchblade Sisters (a.k.a. The Jezebels), directed by Jack Hill

T
Take a Hard Ride, starring Jim Brown and Lee Van Cleef
Terror of Mechagodzilla (Mekagojira no gyakushu), directed by Ishirō Honda  (Japan)
They Fought for Their Country (Они сражались за Родину), directed by Sergei Bondarchuk  (USSR)
Three Days of the Condor, directed by Sydney Pollack, starring Robert Redford, Faye Dunaway, Cliff Robertson
Tommy (March 19), directed by Ken Russell, starring Oliver Reed, Ann-Margret, Jack Nicholson, Roger Daltrey  (UK)
The Travelling Players (Ο Θίασος; O Thiassos), directed by Theo Angelopoulos  (Greece)

U
The Ultimate Warrior, starring Yul Brynner
Unter dem Pflaster ist der Strand, directed by Helma Sanders-Brahms  (West Germany)

V
Villa Zone (Vilna Zona), directed by Eduard Zahariev, starring Itzhak Fintzi, Katya Paskaleva, Naum Shopov  (Bulgaria)

W
W.W. and the Dixie Dancekings, directed by John G. Avildsen, starring Burt Reynolds and Art Carney
Walking Tall Part 2, starring Bo Svenson 
White Line Fever, starring Jan-Michael Vincent and Kay Lenz
The Wilby Conspiracy, directed by Ralph Nelson, starring Sidney Poitier and Michael Caine  (UK)
The Wild Party, directed by James Ivory, starring Raquel Welch, James Coco, Perry King
The Wind and the Lion (May 22), directed by John Milius, starring Sean Connery and Candice Bergen
A Woman's Decision (Bilans kwartalny)  (Poland)
The Wrong Move, directed by Wim Wenders, starring Rüdiger Vogler and Hanna Schygulla  (West Germany)

X
Xala, directed by Ousmane Sembène  (Senegal)

Y
The Yakuza, directed by Sydney Pollack, starring Robert Mitchum and Ken Takakura  (US/Japan)

Z
Zaklęte rewiry (a.k.a. Hotel Pacific)  (Poland)

Births
January 1
Sonali Bendre, Indian actress
Toni Ann Gisondi, American former child actress
January 2: Dax Shepard, American actor
January 3
Jason Marsden, American actor
Danica McKellar, American actress
January 5: Bradley Cooper, American actor and film director
January 6: Nicole DeHuff, American actress (d. 2005)
January 9: Patrick Sabongui, Canadian actor and stunt performer
January 15: Jorge R. Gutierrez, Mexican animator, director, writer and voice actor
January 16: Julie Ann Emery, American actress
January 31: Preity Zinta, Indian actress
February 3: Terry Chen, Canadian actor
February 4: Natalie Imbruglia, Australian-British singer and actress
February 5: Alison Hammond, English television personality and actress
February 7: Dan Green (voice actor), American voice actor, voice director and screenwriter
February 14: Malik Zidi, French actor
February 17: Raymond S. Persi, American animator, director, screenwriter, producer, storyboard artist and voice actor
February 22: Drew Barrymore, American actress and director
February 23: Callan Mulvey, Australian actor
February 25: Chelsea Handler, American comedian, actress, writer, television host and producer
March 3:
Patric Chiha, Austrian film director and screenwriter
Tiger Chen, Chinese martial artist, actor and stuntman
March 9: Chaske Spencer, American actor and producer
March 11: Josh Robert Thompson, American voice actor, actor, comedian and the impressionist
March 15:
Eva Longoria, American actress, director and producer
Will.i.am, American actor and singer/rapper
March 16: Sienna Guillory, English actress
March 18: Charles Parnell (actor), American actor
March 21: Justin Pierce, American-British actor and skateboarder (d. 2000)
March 22:
Guillermo Diaz, American actor
Nathan Greno, American director and writer
Cole Hauser, American actor
March 27: Stacy Ferguson, American actress and singer-songwriter
April 2:
Deedee Magno, Filipino-American actress and singer
Pedro Pascal, Chilean and American actor
Adam Rodriguez, American actor
April 6: Zach Braff, American actor, director, screenwriter and producer
April 10: David Harbour, American actor
April 13: Angus MacLane, American director, animator, screenwriter and voice actor
April 15: Elissa Knight, American employee at Pixar and voice actress
April 21: Charlie O'Connell, American actor
April 27: Erica Schroeder, American voice actress
April 30: Johnny Galecki, American actor
May 3: 
Christina Hendricks, American actress
Dulé Hill, American actor
May 8: Wilmer Calderon, Puerto Rican-American actor
May 9: Chris Diamantopoulos, Greek-Canadian actor and voice artist
May 22: Harriet Toompere, Estonian actress 
May 24: Will Sasso, Canadian-American actor, comedian, voice actor and former podcaster
May 26: Nicki Aycox, American actress and musician (d. 2022)
May 27: André 3000, American singer, songwriter, rapper and actor
June 4: 
Russell Brand, English comedian, actor and radio host
Angelina Jolie, American actress
June 8: Shilpa Shetty, Indian actress
June 10: Nicole Bilderback, Korean-born American actress
June 11: John Tui, New Zealand actor of Tungan descent
June 19: Hugh Dancy, English actor
June 25: Linda Cardellini, American actress
June 27: Tobey Maguire, American actor
June 28: Jeff Geddis, Canadian actor
June 29: Șerban Pavlu, Romanian actor
July 2: Elizabeth Reaser, American actress
July 3: Ryan McPartlin, American actor
July 5: Sope Aluko, Nigerian-born British-American actress
July 6: 50 Cent, American actor and rapper
July 7: Nina Hoss, German film and stage actress
July 9: Nathaniel Marston, American actor and producer (d. 2015)
July 10: Stefán Karl Stefánsson, Icelandic actor and singer (d. 2018)
July 11: Bridgette Andersen, American actress (d. 1997)
July 13: Gareth Edwards (director), British filmmaker
July 17:
Elena Anaya, Spanish actress
Cécile de France, Belgian actress
July 19: Reuben Langdon, American stuntman and voice actor
July 20:
Judy Greer, American actress
Jason Raize, American actor, singer and former Goodwill Ambassador for the United Nations Environment Programme (d. 2004)
July 21: David Dastmalchian, American actor
July 22: Hannah Waterman, English actress
July 23: Suriya, Indian actor
July 28: Ori Pfeffer, Israeli actor
August 5: Stéphanie Szostak, French actress
August 7:
Hans Matheson, Scottish actor and musician
Charlize Theron, South African actress
August 11: Roger Craig Smith, American actor and voice actor
August 12: Casey Affleck, American actor
August 13: James Carpinello, American actor
August 16:
Brad Morris, American actor
Taika Waititi, New Zealand filmmaker, actor and comedian
August 18: Kaitlin Olson, American actress, comedian and producer
August 24: James D'Arcy, English actor and director
August 25: Raymond Wong Ho-yin, Hong Kong actor
August 27: Bodie Olmos, American actor
August 28: Eugene Byrd, American actor
August 29:
Dante Basco, American actor
Juan Diego Botto, Argentine-Spanish actor
September 1: Jason Zumwalt, American actor, voice actor, comedian and screenwriter
September 2: MC Chris, American rapper, voice actor, and comedian
September 18: Jason Sudeikis, American actor, comedian and screenwriter
September 20: Moon Bloodgood, American actress
September 22: Mireille Enos, American actress
September 23: Kip Pardue, American actor and model
September 27: Sam Lee, Hong Kong actor
September 30 
Asia Argento, Italian actress
Marion Cotillard, French actress
Christopher Jackson (actor), American actor, singer, musician and composer
October 3 - Alanna Ubach, American actress
October 4 - Reggie Lee (actor), Filipino-American actor
October 5
Parminder Nagra, English actress
Monica Rial, American voice actress
Scott Weinger, American actor
Kate Winslet, English actress
October 7: Kaspars Znotiņš, Latvian actor
October 11: Nat Faxon, American actor, comedian, director and screenwriter
October 15: Chukwudi Iwuji, Nigerian-British actor
October 16:
Nelson Lee, Taiwanese-Canadian actor
Kellie Martin, American actress
October 31: Keith Jardine, American actor
November 2: Danny Cooksey, American actor and musician
November 8: Tara Reid, American actress
November 12: Steven Kynman, British actor, puppeteer, writer and voice actor
November 16: David Leitch, American filmmaker, actor, stunt performer and stunt coordinator
November 19: Sushmita Sen, Indian actress
November 22: James Madio, American actor
November 26: DJ Khaled, American DJ, rapper and actor
December 1: David Hornsby, American actor
December 5: Paula Patton, American actress
December 12: Mayim Bialik, American actress and game show host
December 17
Milla Jovovich, Ukrainian-American actress
Hilje Murel, Estonian actress
December 22: Omar Dorsey, American actor
December 27: Heather O'Rourke, American child actress (d. 1988)
December 31: Amy Palant, American voice actress and singer

Deaths

Film debuts
Jack Angel – Funny Lady
Tom Bower –  A Woman for All Men
Kim Cattrall – Rosebud
Maury Chaykin – Me
Robert Costanzo – Dog Day Afternoon
Tim Curry – The Rocky Horror Picture Show
Ken Davitian – Sons of Sassoun
Brad Dourif – One Flew Over the Cuckoo's Nest
Griffin Dunne – The Other Side of the Mountain
Laurence Fishburne – Cornbread, Earl and Me
Carrie Fisher – Shampoo
Richard Gere – Report to the Commissioner
Patrick Gorman – Three Days of the Condor
Bernard Hill – It Could Happen to You
Brion James – Hard Times
Nastassja Kinski – The Wrong Move
Christopher Lloyd – One Flew Over the Cuckoo's Nest
Mary Stuart Masterson – The Stepford Wives
Rudy Ray Moore – Dolemite
Bill Paxton – Crazy Mama
Dennis Quaid – Crazy Mama
Rajinikanth – Apoorva Raagangal
Leo Rossi – Alias Big Cherry
Chris Sarandon – Dog Day Afternoon
Lin Shaye – Hester Street
Don Stark – Switchblade Sisters
Patrick Stewart – Hennessy
John Travolta – The Devil's Rain
Dee Wallace – The Stepford Wives
Steven Williams – Cooley High
Treat Williams – Deadly Hero

Notes

References

 
Film by year